Our Lady of Mount Carmel, or Virgin of Carmel, is the title given to the Blessed Virgin Mary in her role as patroness of the Carmelite Order, particularly within the Catholic Church. The first Carmelites were Christian hermits living on Mount Carmel in the Holy Land during the late 12th and early to mid-13th century. They built in the midst of their hermitages a chapel which they dedicated to the Blessed Virgin, whom they conceived of in chivalric terms as the "Lady of the place." Our Lady of Mount Carmel was adopted in the 19th century as the patron saint of Chile.

Since the 15th century, popular devotion to Our Lady of Mount Carmel has centered on the Scapular of Our Lady of Mount Carmel, also known as the Brown Scapular. Traditionally, Mary is said to have given the Scapular to an early Carmelite named Simon Stock (1165–1265). The liturgical feast of Our Lady of Mount Carmel is celebrated on 16 July. 

The solemn liturgical feast of Our Lady of Mount Carmel was probably first celebrated in England in the later part of the 14th century. Its object was thanksgiving to Mary, the patroness of the Carmelite Order, for the benefits she had accorded to it through its difficult early years. The institution of the feast may have come in the wake of the vindication of their title "Brothers of the Blessed Virgin Mary" at Cambridge, England, in 1374. The date chosen was 17 July; on the European mainland this date conflicted with the feast of Saint Alexis, requiring a shift to 16 July, which remains the Feast of Our Lady of Mount Carmel on the Roman Calendar of the Catholic Church. The Latin poem "Flos Carmeli" (meaning "Flower of Carmel") first appears as the sequence for this Mass.

History

The Carmelite Order was the only religious order to be started in the Crusader States. In the 13th century, some of its people migrated west to England, setting up a chapter and being documented there about 1241–1242. A tradition first attested to in the late 14th century says that Simon Stock, believed to be an early English prior general of the Carmelite Order soon after its migration to England, had a vision of the Blessed Virgin Mary in which she gave him the Brown Scapular. This formed part of the Carmelite habit after 1287. In Stock's vision, Mary promised that those who died wearing the scapular would be saved. This is a devotional sacramental signifying the wearer's consecration to Mary and affiliation with the Carmelite order. It symbolizes her special protection and calls the wearers to consecrate themselves to her in a special way.

In 1642, a Carmelite named John Cheron published a document which he said was a 13th-century letter written by Simon Stock's secretary, Peter Swanington. Since the early 20th century, historians have concluded that this letter was forged, likely by Cheron himself.

But Stock's vision was long embraced by many promoters of the scapular devotion. The forged Swanington letter claimed that 16 July 1251 was the date of the vision (16 July being the date of the Feast of Our Lady of Mount Carmel), which led for centuries to a strong association between this feast day and the scapular devotion. Based on available historical documentation, the liturgical feast of Our Lady of Mount Carmel did not originally have a specific association with the Brown Scapular or the tradition of Stock's vision of the Blessed Virgin Mary. This tradition grew gradually, as did the liturgical cult of Saint Simon. The latter has been documented in Bordeaux, where Stock died, from the year 1435; in Ireland and England, from 1458; and in the rest of the Order, from 1564. Historians have long questioned whether Stock had the vision of Mary and the scapular. Although Simon Stock was never officially canonized, his feast day was celebrated in the church. The Carmelite convent of Aylesford, England, was restored and a relic of Saint Simon Stock was placed there in 1951. The saint's feast is celebrated in the places dedicated to him.

Also associated with Our Lady of Carmel was a papal bull saying that there was a Sabbatine privilege associated with devotion to the saint; that is, until the late 1970s, the Catholic liturgy for that day mentioned the scapular devotion. Vatican II resulted in scrutiny of the Feast of Our Lady of Mount Carmel, as well as that of Simon Stock, because of the historical uncertainties about the origins. The liturgies were revised and, in the 21st century, neither, even in the Carmelite proper, makes reference to the scapular.

In Spain and other Spanish-speaking countries, there has been particular devotion to Our Lady of Mount Carmel, who has been adopted as a patron saint of several places, as she has been in other Catholic-majority countries. In addition, Carmen and María del Carmen have been popular given names for girls in Spanish-speaking countries. An annual festival, known as Mamacha Carmen, is held in the highland Paucartambo District, Peru, featuring a procession with the Virgin and traditional dancers. Veneration of the Virgen del Carmen (often also associated with the Stella Maris) is particularly strong in coastal towns of Spain.

The feast day of Our Lady of Mount Carmel is celebrated for ten days each July in the Williamsburg neighborhood of Brooklyn, New York, where an approximately sixty-five foot tall "giglio" – a tower with a statue of Our Lady of Mount Carmel affixed atop it – is lifted and paraded on multiple dates during the festival. The festival culminates with the celebration of the liturgical feast of Our Lady on July 16.

Carmelite devotion
The Carmelites consider the Blessed Virgin Mary to be a perfect model of the interior life of prayer and contemplation to which Carmelites aspire, as well as a model of virtue, in the person who was closest in life to Jesus Christ. She is seen as the one who points Christians most surely to Christ. As she says to the servants at the wedding at Cana, "Do whatever he [Jesus] tells you." Carmelites look to the Virgin Mary as a Spiritual Mother. The Stella Maris Monastery (Star of the Sea) on Mount Carmel, named after a traditional title of the Blessed Virgin Mary, is considered the spiritual headquarters of the order.

Gabriel of St. Mary Magdalene de' Pazzi, a revered authority on Carmelite spirituality, wrote that devotion to Our Lady of Mount Carmel means:
Devotees the Blessed Mother of Mount Carmel might raise petitions to her through the prayer:

Church teaching 
A 1996 doctrinal statement approved by the Congregation for Divine Worship and the Discipline of the Sacraments states that 
Devotion to Our Lady of Mount Carmel is bound to the history and spiritual values of the Order of the Brothers of the Blessed Virgin Mary of Mount Carmel and is expressed through the scapular. Thus, whoever receives the scapular becomes a member of the order and pledges him/herself to live according to its spirituality in accordance with the characteristics of his/her state in life.

Discalced Carmelite Kieran Kavanaugh summarizes this spirituality: 
The scapular is a Marian habit or garment. It is both a sign and pledge. A sign of belonging to Mary; a pledge of her motherly protection, not only in this life but after death. As a sign, it is a conventional sign signifying three elements strictly joined: first, belonging to a religious family particularly devoted to Mary, especially dear to Mary, the Carmelite Order; second, consecration to Mary, devotion to and trust in her Immaculate Heart; third, an urge to become like Mary by imitating her virtues, above all her humility, chastity, and spirit of prayer.

Association with Purgatory

Since the Middle Ages, Our Lady of Mount Carmel has been related to purgatory and purgation from sins after death. In some images, she is portrayed as accompanied with angels and persons wearing Brown Scapulars, who plead for her mediation. In 1613, the Church forbade images to be made of Our Lady of Mt. Carmel descending into purgatory, due to errors being preached about certain privileges associated with the Brown Scapular (known as "the Sabbatine Privilege").

That privilege appears in the noted Decree of the Holy Office (1613). It was inserted in its entirety (except for the words forbidding the painting of the pictures) into the list of the indulgences and privileges of the Confraternity of the Scapular of Mount Carmel. In the 21st century, the Carmelites do not promote the Sabbatine Privilege. They encourage a belief in Mary's general aid and prayerful assistance for persons beyond death, especially her aid to those who devoutly wear the Brown Scapular, and commend devotion to Mary especially on Saturdays, which are dedicated to her.

Apparitions
There is today a small sanctuary at Acquafondata, Italy, where the Virgin of Mount Carmel reportedly appeared on 16 July 1841. The visionaries of Our Lady of Fátima in 1917 reported Our Lady of Mount Carmel as among the titles claimed by Mary. She is said to have appeared to Simon Stock to whom she gave the Brown Scapular. The Garabandal apparitions in Spain (1961–65) were reported to be images of the Blessed Virgin Mary of Mount Carmel.

Miracles
In Palmi, Italy, the anniversary of the earthquake of 1894 is observed annually on 16 November. The earthquake had its epicenter in the city. An associated event has been classified as the "miracle of Our Lady of Mount Carmel." For 17 days preceding this earthquake, many of the faithful had reported strange eye movements and changes in the coloring of the face in a statue of Our Lady of Mount Carmel. The local and national press reported these occurrences.

In the evening of 16 November, the faithful improvised a procession carrying the statue of the Virgin of Carmel on their shoulders through the streets. When the procession reached the end of the city, a violent earthquake shook the whole district of Palmi, ruining most of the old houses along the way. But, only nine people died out of a population of about 15,000 inhabitants, as almost all of the population had been on the street to watch the procession and were not trapped inside the destroyed buildings. Therefore, the city commemorates the 1894 procession each year, accompanied by firecrackers, lights, and festive stalls.

The Catholic Church has officially recognized the miracle. On 16 November 1896, the statue of the Virgin was crowned, based on the decree issued 22 September 1895, by the Vatican Chapter.

Use in the peace movement
The first atomic bomb was exploded in the United States at the Trinity test site on 16 July 1945, near Alamogordo, New Mexico. The Catholic anti-war movement has built on the coincidence between this date and the Feast of Our Lady of Mount Carmel. In 1990 the Rev. Emmanuel Charles McCarthy, a priest of the Eastern Rite (Byzantine-Melkite) of the Catholic Church, initiated the "16 July Twenty-Four Hours Day of Prayer," for forgiveness and protection from Our Lady of Mount Carmel, at Trinity Site in the New Mexico desert. Each year on 16 July, a prayer vigil is conducted at the Trinity site to pray for peace and the elimination of nuclear weapons.

Gallery of statues

Statues of Our Lady of Mount Carmel usually depict her with a Brown scapular.

Places and churches named after Our Lady of Mount Carmel

Angola
Igreja Nosso Senhora do Carmo, Luanda, Angola

Croatia
The Church of Our Lady of Mount Carmel, Brela, Split-Dalmatia County, Croatia

Hungary
Little Saint Therese Basilica and Monastery, Zala County, Keszthely

Panama

Iglesia Nuestra Sra. del Carmen (a.k.a. Iglesia del Carmen), Panama City

Philippines

Basilica of The National Shrine of Our Lady of Mount Carmel, New Manila, Quezon City
Santuario Arquidiocesano de Nuestra Señora del Carmen, La Limpia, Magallanes, Cebu City
Our Lady of Mount Carmel Parish, Quezon City
Our Lady of Mount Carmel Parish, Pulong Buhangin, Santa Maria, Bulacan 
Our Lady of Mt. Carmel Project 6 Parish, Quezon City
Our Lady of Mount Carmel Parish, Balilihan, Bohol
Our Lady of Mt. Carmel Seminary, Tumbaga I, Sariaya, Quezon
The Minor Basilica of San Sebastian, Pasaje del Carmen St, Quiapo, Manila
Our Lady of Mt. Carmel Parish, Tariji, Tarlac City
Our Lady of Mt. Carmel Parish,  Barasoain Church, City of Malolos, Bulacan
Nuestra Señora del Carmen Parish, Duat, Pulungmasle, Guagua, Pampanga

Spain
Puerto Del Carmen, Tías, Canary Islands

United States
Mount Carmel, IA 
National Shrine of Our Lady of Mount Carmel, Middletown, NY
Our Lady of Mount Carmel Catholic Church, Mount Carmel, IA
The Parish – Shrine of Our Lady of Mount Carmel Catholic Church, Melrose Park, IL
Our Lady of Mount Carmel – Annunciation, Brooklyn, NY
Our Lady of Mount Carmel Catholic Church, Altoona, PA
Our Lady of Mount Carmel Catholic Church, Niles, OH
Our Lady of Mount Carmel Catholic Church, Lowellville, OH
Our Lady of Mount Carmel Catholic Church, Newport Beach, CA
Our Lady of Mount Carmel Catholic Church, Minneapolis, MN
 Iglesia de Nuestra Señora del Carmen, Hatillo, Puerto Rico
Río Carmel, Carmel-by-the-Sea, CA

Wales 
 Church of Our Lady of Mount Carmel, Lampeter

See also
 Byzantine Discalced Carmelites
 Discalced Carmelites
 Prayer of the Blessed Virgin
 Our Lady of Mount Carmel, patron saint archive

References

External links

 Brown Scapular: a "Silent Devotion" – 2008 article via Zenit news service by Fr. Kieran Kavenaugh, OCD discusses devotion to the Brown Scapular, the existence of historical problems, and pastoral practice
 The Virgin Mary in our life – Article about Marian devotion in the Carmelite tradition
 The apparitions of Our Lady of Mount Carmel

 
Titles of Mary
Mount Carmel
Catholic devotions